Logan Park is a neighborhood in the Northeast community in Minneapolis, Minnesota.

Location and characteristics
Logan Park's boundaries are 19th Avenue NE to the north, Central Avenue to the east, Broadway Street NE to the south, and Washington Street NE to the west.  It is named after Logan Park (located within its borders) which is, in turn, named after Civil War general and US Senator John A. Logan.

The neighborhood was originally settled in the late 19th century and built around Logan Park itself. Homes near the park tend to be larger and Victorian in style. The remainder of the neighborhood is smaller residential housing and industrial space with much of the industry clustered around the railroad tracks running parallel to Central Avenue. Many of the neighborhood's industrial buildings (such as the Northrup-King headquarters) have since been re-purposed as artist studios and galleries. The neighborhood is now considered part of the Northeast Minneapolis Arts District.

Landmarks
Logan Park's central feature is the city park which shares its name. It was formerly home to Holland Elementary School which closed in 2005.

Transportation
The neighborhood is served by Metro Transit bus routes 10 (Central Avenue), 17 (Washington Street) and 30 (Broadway Street). Central Avenue has dedicated bike lanes.

References

Neighborhoods in Minneapolis